OTU deubiquitinase 5 is a protein that in humans is encoded by the OTUD5 gene.

Function

This gene encodes a member of the OTU (ovarian tumor) domain-containing cysteine protease superfamily. The OTU domain confers deubiquitinase activity and the encoded protein has been shown to suppress the type I interferon-dependent innate immune response by cleaving the polyubiquitin chain from an essential type I interferon adaptor protein. Cleavage results in disassociation of the adaptor protein from a downstream signaling complex and disruption of the type I interferon signaling cascade. Alternatively spliced transcript variants encoding different isoforms have been described.

References

Further reading

External links